Dundarave is a country house in the village of Bushmills, County Antrim, Northern Ireland.  It was the ancestral seat of the Macnaghten family, which is the chiefly family of Clan Macnaghten.

Dundarave was designed by Sir Charles Lanyon, the eminent architect, and was built in 1846, a contemporary of Castle Leslie. It occupies high ground over the village of Bushmills and the coastline of North Antim, near the port of Portballintrae. The estate is designated within planning laws under Historic Parks, Gardens and Demesnes.

In 2014, Dundarave (Bushmills) and its 549.7 acres (222.46 ha.) was listed for sale with Savills U.K. at the guide price of £5,000,000.

External links
A photograph of part of Dundarave;

References

Country houses in Northern Ireland
Buildings and structures in County Antrim
Grade B+ listed buildings
Houses completed in 1846